Troia (also formerly Troja; ;) is a town and comune in the province of Foggia and region of Apulia in southern Italy.

History
According to the legend, Troia (Aecae) was founded by the Greek hero Diomedes, who had destroyed the ancient Troy. 

Aecae was mentioned both by Polybius and Livy, during the military operations of Hannibal and Quintus Fabius Maximus Verrucosus in Apulia. In common with many other Apulian cities it had joined the Carthaginians after the battle of Cannae, but was recovered by Fabius Maximus in 214 BC, though not without a regular siege. This interval exactly accords with the position of the modern city of Troia, and confirms the statements of several chroniclers of the Middle Ages, that the latter was founded about the beginning of the 11th century, on the ruins of the ancient Aecae. 

Cluverius erroneously identified Aecae with Accadia, a village in the Daunian Mountains south of Bovino; but his error was rectified by Holstenius.

The current Troia was founded as a fortified town in Apulia in 1018 by Basil Boioannes. It defended the entrance into the Apulian plain from the Normans. Until overshadowed by Foggia, it was an important strategic town in southern Italy, and was several times besieged, notably, by the emperors Henry II and Frederick II. After the latter's fall, it sided for the Angevines, and later, against the former, for the Aragonese.

After the unification of Southern Italy (1861), Troia rebelled and the Savoy troops intervened with the use of cannons.

Main sights
Troia Cathedral, an example of Apulian Romanesque architecture
Basilica of St. Basil (11th century)
Baroque church of St. Francis
Church of San Vincenzo (10th century)
Palazzo Principi d'Avalos
Jesuits' Palace (16th century)
Municipal Museum, with archaeological findings from the area and an art gallery
Diocesan Museum, housed in the 18th century Benedictine Nunnery, and the New Museum of the Cathedral's Treasure. The latter is home to medieval rolls of the Exultet.

Transportation 

It is   the only municipality in Italy to provide free public transport.

See also
Roman Catholic Diocese of Lucera-Troia

Sources and references

References

External links

Adrian Fletcher’s Paradoxplace – Troia Photo Page

Fortifications in Italy
1018 establishments in Europe
11th-century establishments in Italy
Populated places established in the 11th century